The Johore Strait (also known as the Tebrau Strait, Straits of Johor,  Selat Johor, Selat Tebrau, and Tebrau Reach) is an international strait in Southeast Asia, between Singapore and Peninsular Malaysia.

Geography
The strait separates the Malaysian state of Johor on the mainland Malay Peninsula to the north, from Singapore and its islands on the south. It connects to the Strait of Malacca on the west, and the Singapore Strait on the southeast.

The mouth and delta of the Johor River is on its northeast side in Malaysia.

Crossings

There are currently two bridges crossing the strait. The Johor–Singapore Causeway, known simply as "The Causeway", links Johor Bahru and Woodlands in Singapore. The Malaysia–Singapore Second Link bridge is further west over the strait, links Iskandar Puteri in Malaysia and Tuas in Singapore.

In 2003, Malaysia wanted to build a bridge across the strait to replace the existing causeway, but negotiations with Singapore were not successful. The main reasons cited for the change were:
 a bridge would allow free flow of water across both sides of the strait which were artificially cut in two with the building of the causeway before (this would allow ships to bypass the port of Singapore).
 a bridge would help ease congestion in Johor Bahru.

In August 2003, Malaysia announced that it was going ahead with a plan to build a gently sloping, curved bridge that would join up with Singapore's half of the existing causeway. The plans included a swing bridge for the railway line. However, plans to build the bridge have been called off by Malaysia as of 2006 after Singapore said it was amenable to the bridge if the negotiations include other bilateral matters such as the use of Malaysian airspace by Singapore's air force and the buying of water and sand resources from Malaysia. Malaysia viewed Singapore's proposal as a compromise on its sovereignty.

Other proposed crossings include Johor Bahru–Singapore Rapid Transit System and Kuala Lumpur–Singapore high-speed rail. Both of which would have started construction in 2019, but have since been delayed due to the change of political administration in Malaysia in 2018 and the ongoing efforts to reduce national debts incurred previously under Najib Razak's administration.

Tributaries
Major tributaries which empty into the Strait of Johore include:

 Johor River
 Pelentong River
 Pulai River
 Segget River
 Tebrau River
 Sungai Sengkuang
 Sungai Haji Rahmat
 Sungai Kempas
 Sungai Sri Buntan
 Sungai Abd Samad
 Sungai Air Molek
 Sungai Stulang
 Sungai Setanggong
 Sungai Tampoi
 Sungai Sebulong
 Sungai Bala
 Sungai Pandan
 Sungai Tengkorak
 Sungai Senibong

In the Malay language, Sungai is the word for river.

Ecology
Pollution along the Johore Strait is notable.

The area is also a source of environmental contention between Malaysia and Singapore, due to land reclamation projects on both sides of the Causeway.  There have been suggestions that the ongoing land reclamation projects may impact the maritime boundary, shipping lanes, and water ecology of the Malaysian side.  Environmental Impact Assessments are requested before any reclamation is carried out such as the Forest City project.

Reclamation projects may also endanger the habitat and food source of dugongs, which are native to the strait.

History 
The Johore Strait is the location of two Victoria Cross deeds. The award was for Lieutenant Ian Edward Fraser and Acting Leading Seaman James Joseph Magennis for the sinking of the 9,850-tonne Japanese cruiser Takao on 31 July 1945.

Places of interest 
A well known tourist attraction of the Strait of Johore's is Lido Beach, located on the Malaysian side in Johor Bahru. Here, visitors can walk or cycle along the 2 km stretch of the beach. There are numerous restaurants and food stalls.

References

External links

Johor
Johor
Straits of the South China Sea
Johor
Malaysia–Singapore border
Peninsular Malaysia
Strait of Malacca